Alexandre Roubtzoff (Russian: Александр Александрович Рубцов; 24 January 1884, St. Petersburg - 26 November 1949, Tunis) was a Russian-born French painter who specialized in Orientalist scenes. Most of his adult life was spent in Tunisia.

Biography
His mother, Evgenia, was unmarried. In 1897, by decree, he was allowed to take his mother's surname and a patronymic from his grandfather. He was raised by his godmother, Ekaterina, and her husband, the Polish artist Jan Ciągliński.

He began his artistic education at the drawing school where his godmother taught, then was a student of Dmitry Kardovsky and Ciągliński, at the Imperial Academy of Arts, where he was awarded a total of six grand prizes. During the 1900s, he travelled extensively with his adoptive parents, visiting Warsaw, Vienna, Venice, Munich and Paris. In 1907, he stayed in Paris for an extended period and became a regular visitor at the studios of Odilon Redon.

As the holder of a scholarship from the Academy, he travelled through Germany, France and Spain and discovered North Africa; arriving in Tangier in 1913. The following year, he went to Tunis and, after his scholarship expired, decided to settle there permanently; becoming a French citizen in 1924. He attended the Institut de Carthage and earned his living as a portrait painter for the members of French colonial society. In 1920, he held a major exhibition of over 125 works at the Tunis Salon. Many of his local models also worked for the photographer, Rudolf Franz Lehnert.   

Later, he would develop a greater interest in the character of the people themselves who, despite being poor and uneducated were, in his opinion, beautiful and noble, whereas cultured people were "ugly, petty and inelegant".

He held numerous exhibitions in France, as well as in Tunis, and some of his paintings were purchased by the government. Many of his works may still be seen at official residences.

In 1984, a major retrospective was held at the Château de Bagatelle, in Paris, in connection with the 100th anniversary of his birth. In 2010, he was paid homage in Tunisia with an exhibit called "Roubtzoff et la Médina"; 48 drawings he made in 1944, as well as a few paintings. Some of his works have been used for Tunisian postage stamps.

Selected paintings

References

Further reading 
 Patrick Dubreucq, Alexandre Roubtzoff (1884-1949). Une vie en Tunisie, éditions ACR, Courbevoie, 1996 
 Pierre Dumas, Roubtzoff, peintre de la lumière. 1884-1949, éditions Privat Toulouse, 1951.
 Jacques Gerigny, Roubtzoff et Paris, Société générale d'imprimerie et d'édition, Paris, 1936.
 Alya Hamza, Alexandre Roubtzoff. Peintre tunisien, éditions de la Méditerranée, Tunis, 1994.
 René de Sainte-Marie, Roubtzoff, éditions du Rayonnement, Paris, 1947.
 Jacques Pérez and Binous, Jamila, Alexandre Roubtzoff et la médina de Tunis, Dunes, Tunis, 2010 
 Jacques Pérez, Alexandre Roubtzoff, La Tunisie, Collection Regard, Tunis, 2017

External links 

More works by Roubtzoff @ ArtNet

1884 births
1949 deaths
Tunisian painters
French portrait painters
French orientalists
French people of Russian descent
19th-century French painters
20th-century French painters
Painters from Saint Petersburg
20th-century deaths from tuberculosis
Tuberculosis deaths in Tunisia